Route 343 is a provincial highway located in the Lanaudière region of Quebec. It runs from Route 138 west of Saint-Sulpice and south of Autoroute 40 and ends at the junction of Route 347 east of Saint-Come and north of Saint-Alphonse-Rodriguez where it has a concurrency with Route 337.

Municipalities along Route 343

 L'Assomption
 Saint-Paul
 Joliette
 Saint-Charles-Borromée
 Saint-Ambroise-de-Kildare
 Saint-Alphonse-Rodriguez

See also
 List of Quebec provincial highways

References

External links 
 Transports Quebec Official Map 
 Route 343 on Google Maps

343
Roads in Lanaudière
Joliette